Tokarczuk or Tokarchuk (Russian or Ukrainian: Токарчук) is a gender-neutral Slavic surname that may refer to:

 Byron Tokarchuk (born 1965), Canadian basketball player 
 Ignacy Tokarczuk (1918–2012), Polish bishop
 Olga Tokarczuk (born 1962), Polish writer

Polish-language surnames
Ukrainian-language surnames